Zaid Al-Hussaini (born 7 June 2000) is a professional footballer who plays as a winger. Born in England, he has represented Iraq at youth international level.

Career
Al-Hussaini was born in Chelsea and grew up in Shepherd's Bush.

He joined Derby County in 2018, signing his first professional contract with the club, having previously played for the FFDTV Academy, Bedfont & Feltham and Chalfont St Peter. He joined Gloucester City on a one-month loan in November 2018, before leaving Derby County by mutual consent on 8 March 2019. He subsequently joined Potters Bar Town later that day. He made his debut for Potters Bar Town the following day, coming on as a substitute in a 1–0 home defeat to Carshalton Athletic. He joined Hampton & Richmond Borough at the start of the following season prior to a spell at Staines Town.

He joined League Two club Crawley Town on a three-year contract starting on 1 August 2020.

On 4 December 2020, Al-Hussaini joined National League club Weymouth on a month-long loan. He made his debut for Weymouth on 8 December 2020 in a 3–2 home defeat to Dagenham & Redbridge.

On 5 November 2021, Al-Hussaini signed for Chelmsford City on loan. The loan ended in January 2022. On 25 March 2022, Al-Hussaini joined Chippenham Town on loan until the end of the season. In November 2022 he joined Maidstone United on loan, but made no appearances before returning to Crawley.

He left Crawley by mutual consent on 27 February 2023.

International career
Born in England, Al-Hussaini is of Iraqi descent, having represented Iraq internationally at under-19 level.

Career statistics

References

2000 births
Living people
English footballers
English people of Iraqi descent
Iraqi footballers
Iraq youth international footballers
Footballers from Chelsea, London
Association football midfielders
Bedfont & Feltham F.C. players
Chalfont St Peter A.F.C. players
Derby County F.C. players
Gloucester City A.F.C. players
Potters Bar Town F.C. players
Hampton & Richmond Borough F.C. players
Staines Town F.C. players
Crawley Town F.C. players
Weymouth F.C. players
Chelmsford City F.C. players
Chippenham Town F.C. players
Maidstone United F.C. players
National League (English football) players
Southern Football League players
Isthmian League players